Jorge Alexis Kindelán Cuervo, known as Jorge Kindelán (born 12 April 1986) is a Cuban football player. He plays for Santiago de Cuba.

Club career
He made his Cuba national football team debut on 15 August 2018 in a friendly against Guatemala.

He was selected for their 2019 CONCACAF Gold Cup squad.

References

External links
 
 

1986 births
Sportspeople from Santiago de Cuba
Living people
Cuban footballers
Cuba international footballers
Association football defenders
FC Santiago de Cuba players
2019 CONCACAF Gold Cup players
21st-century Cuban people